Jackson Township is one of fourteen townships in Bremer County, Iowa, USA.  At the 2010 census, its population was 1,446.

Geography
According to the USGS, it contains three cemeteries: Oakland, Pilot Mound and Waverly Junction.

References

External links
 US-Counties.com
 City-Data.com

Townships in Bremer County, Iowa
Waterloo – Cedar Falls metropolitan area
Townships in Iowa